Cyrtospiriferidae is an extinct family of Brachiopods.

Genera
 Acutella
 Austrospirifer
 Cyrtiopsis
 Cyrtospirifer
 Dichospirifer
 Dmitria
 Eodmitria
 Liraspirifer
 Mennespirifer
 Petshorospirifer
 Platyspirifer
 Pripyatispirifer
 Sinospirifer
 Sphaenospira
 Sphenospira
 Syringospira
 Tarandrospirifer
 Tenticospirifer
 Uchtospirifer

References 

Prehistoric protostome families
Prehistoric brachiopods
Brachiopod families
Spiriferida

Animal families